Daniel Mărgărit (born 30 August 1996) is a Romanian professional footballer who plays as a forward.

References

External links
 
 

1996 births
Living people
Sportspeople from Târgu Jiu
Romanian footballers
Association football forwards
Liga I players
Liga II players
CS Pandurii Târgu Jiu players
SSU Politehnica Timișoara players
ACS Viitorul Târgu Jiu players
CS Național Sebiș players
CSM Unirea Alba Iulia players